The Battle of Jahra was a battle during the Kuwait–Najd War, fought between Kuwaiti forces and Saudi-supported militants. The battle took place in Al-Jahra, west of Kuwait City on 10 October 1920 around the Kuwait Red Fort.

The battle
The battle took into effect as a result of the Battle of Hamdh. A force of three to four thousand Ikhwan, led by Faisal Al-Dawish, attacked the Red Fort at Al-Jahra which was defended by fifteen hundred men. The fort was besieged and the Kuwaiti position became precarious; had the fort fallen, Kuwait would likely have been incorporated into Ibn Saud's empire. During the battle, reinforcements from Kuwait City arrived by sea, and combat support was also provided by the Sheikhs of the Shammar; who arrived overland.

The Ikhwan attack repulsed for a while as negotiations began between Salim and Al-Dawish; the latter threatened another attack if the Kuwaiti forces did not surrender. The local merchant class convinced Salim to call in help from British troops, who showed up with airplanes and three warships, ending the attacks.

See also
 Military of Kuwait

References

History of Kuwait
1920 in Asia
Jahra
Jahra